Nina 'Pat' Moore Jamieson (29 April 1885 – 6 November 1932), was an Irish born Canadian teacher, journalist, poet and lecturer.

Life
She was born in Belfast, Ireland in 1885. Her parents William Francis Moore and Georgette Robinson were Canadian and took her back to Canada. She grew up in Cookstown and Dundas, Ontario. Jamieson attended Hamilton (Ontario) Model School and got training in domestic science. She became a teacher, following in her father's line of work. But she worked for several years before getting her qualifications from the Winnipeg Normal school. She was known as Pat to her family and friends. On 23 October 1907 Jamieson married farmer Norman Jamieson and they had four children. She worked for the Ontario Department of Agriculture. Jamieson spent time lecturing to Women's Institutes and the Imperial Order Daughters of the Empire.

During the First World War, encouraged by her mother and husband, Jamieson began to send her work to The Mail and Empire. She was soon a regular journalist working on a column for them. She also contributed to Business Woman, Family Herald, Montreal Weekly Star, Ontario Farmer and Toronto Star Weekly. She managed to publish two volumes of verses and sketches, one before she died, one was arranged by family and friends after her death. Her final book, The Golden Shackle was never published. Jamieson died of breast cancer in 1932. She is buried at St. George Cemetery in Ontario.

In 2006 her life was turned into a one-woman play created by Joann MacLachlan, performed by Maja Bannerman and premiered in the Cobblestone Play Festival in Paris, Ontario.

Bibliography
 The Hickory Stick, (1921)
 The Cattle in the Stall, (1932)

References

External links
 

1885 births
1932 deaths
20th-century Canadian poets
20th-century Canadian women writers
Canadian women journalists
Canadian women poets
People from Simcoe County